

This is a list of the National Register of Historic Places listings in Amite County, Mississippi.

This is intended to be a complete list of the properties on the National Register of Historic Places in Amite County, Mississippi, United States. Latitude and longitude coordinates are provided for many National Register properties; these locations may be seen together in a map.

There are 19 properties listed on the National Register in the county.  Another property was once listed but has been removed.

Current listings

|}

Former listing

|}

See also

 List of National Historic Landmarks in Mississippi
 National Register of Historic Places listings in Mississippi

References

 
Amite County